The American rock band Dave Matthews Band has released nine studio albums, eighty-five live albums, three compilation albums, eight video albums, two extended plays, twenty-nine singles (including one as a featured artist), and twenty-one music videos. DMB has sold over 33 million albums in the United States.

After signing with RCA Records, Dave Matthews Band released its debut studio album, Under the Table and Dreaming (1994). In the United States, the album peaked at number 11 on the Billboard 200 and was certified six times platinum by the Recording Industry Association of America (RIAA). The group's next studio album, Crash (1996), peaked at number two on the Billboard 200 and was certified seven times platinum by the RIAA. Before These Crowded Streets (1998) reached number one on the Billboard 200 and was certified four times platinum by the RIAA; the band's single "Crush", which became the band's first entry on the US Billboard Hot 100, appeared on that album. Before These Crowded Streets was followed by Everyday (2001) (which debuted at number one on the Billboard 200, was certified three times platinum by the RIAA, and featured the band's first top 40 hit, "The Space Between"), Busted Stuff (2002) (which reached number one on the Billboard 200, was certified two times platinum by the RIAA and included another Top 40 hit, "Where Are You Going"), Stand Up (which reached number one, was certified platinum, and contained the band's most successful single to date, "American Baby"), Big Whiskey and the GrooGrux King (which debuted at number one and was certified platinum by the RIAA), Away from the World (2012), and Come Tomorrow (2018).

The group has released multiple live albums throughout its career. While always encouraging fan recordings of concerts for personal enjoyment, the success of the band led to the illegal sale of such recordings. Such copies were often very expensive and of low quality. To meet the demand of the illegal distribution of such recordings, the band released its first concert album, Live at Red Rocks 8.15.95, in October 1997. As of August 2021, the band has released a total of 96 live albums, including 56 from the Live Trax series and 23 from the DMBlive series.

Albums

Studio albums

Live albums

Live Trax

DMBLive

Compilation albums

Ticket Purchase Releases

Video albums

Extended plays

Singles

As featured artist

Other charted songs

Music videos

Notes

A  "What Would You Say" did not enter the Billboard Hot 100, but peaked at #15 on the Bubbling Under Hot 100 Singles chart, which acts as a 25-song extension to the Hot 100. It also peaked at #22 on the Hot 100 Airplay chart.
B  "Ants Marching" did not enter the Billboard Hot 100, but peaked at #21 on the Hot 100 Airplay chart.
C  "Satellite" did not enter the Billboard Hot 100, but peaked at #55 on the Hot 100 Airplay chart.
D  "Too Much" did not enter the Billboard Hot 100, but peaked at #39 on the Hot 100 Airplay chart.
E  "So Much to Say" did not enter the Billboard Hot 100, but peaked at #48 on the Hot 100 Airplay chart.
F  "Crash into Me" did not enter the Billboard Hot 100, but peaked at #19 on the Hot 100 Airplay chart.
G  "Don't Drink the Water" did not enter the Billboard Hot 100, but peaked at #51 on the Hot 100 Airplay chart.
H  "Stay (Wasting Time)" did not enter the Billboard Hot 100, but peaked at #44 on the Hot 100 Airplay chart.
I  "Everyday" did not enter the Billboard Hot 100, but peaked at #1 on the Bubbling Under Hot 100 Singles chart, which acts as a 25-song extension to the Hot 100.
J  "Grey Street" did not enter the Billboard Hot 100, but peaked at #19 on the Bubbling Under Hot 100 Singles chart, which acts as a 25-song extension to the Hot 100.

References

External links
 
 
 

Discography
Discographies of American artists
Discographies of South African artists
Rock music group discographies